Rebecca Moynihan (born 11 December 1981) is an Irish Labour Party politician who has been a Senator for the Administrative Panel since April 2020. 

She is the party's spokesperson on Housing, Local Government, and Heritage. She previously served as a member of Dublin City Council from 2009 to 2020, representing Crumlin-Kimmage and the South West Inner City.

Early life
Moynihan is from a working-class family in Rialto, Dublin.

Political career
Moynihan became involved in the Labour Party at a young age; she was the National Chair of Labour Youth from 2002 to 2004 and is involved in Labour Women.

In 2009, she was elected as a member of Dublin City Council. While a councillor, Moynihan had a motion passed to ensure free period products were available in all Dublin City Council buildings, and secured 100,000 euros in funding for this project. She was elected unopposed as Deputy Lord Mayor of Dublin in 2016 to Lord Mayor Brendan Carr. Darragh Moriarty was co-opted to Moynihan's seat on Dublin City Council following her election to the Seanad.

In February 2020, Moynihan was an unsuccessful Labour Party candidate at the 2020 general election for the Dublin South-Central constituency, getting 2,095 (4.8%) first preference votes.

At the Seanad election in March/April 2020, she was elected to Seanad Éireann on the Administrative Panel.

As the party's spokesperson on housing, Moynihan has opposed co-living proposals put forward by the government, stating that it is "not suitable" and "even more unsuitable in the context of the Covid crisis".

In January 2021, Moynihan tabled her first bill in the Seanad, a bill to combat period poverty. This bill, the Period Products (Free Provisions) Bill, will provide for free tampons, sanitary pads and reusable products in all school bathrooms, educational institutions and public buildings in Ireland, if passed by the government.

Personal life
Prior to becoming a Senator, Moynihan taught at Rathmines College of Further Education.

References

External links
Labour Party profile

Living people
1981 births
21st-century women members of Seanad Éireann
Labour Party (Ireland) senators
Local councillors in Dublin (city)
Members of the 26th Seanad